Qezel Aghaj (also Romanized as Qezel Āghāj; also known as Qezel Āqāch, Qezel Āqāj, and Qizil Aghāch) is a village in Babarashani Rural District, Chang Almas District, Bijar County, Kurdistan Province, Iran. At the 2006 census, its population was 82, in 22 families. The village is populated by Azerbaijanis.

References 

Towns and villages in Bijar County
Azerbaijani settlements in Kurdistan Province